Schizoglossa major was a species of large predatory, air-breathing, land slug, a carnivorous terrestrial pulmonate gastropod mollusc in the family Rhytididae. This species has only been found as a subfossil.

References

 Powell A W B, New Zealand Mollusca, William Collins Publishers Ltd, Auckland, New Zealand 1979

External links
 

Gastropods of New Zealand
Rhytididae
Extinct animals of New Zealand
Gastropods described in 1938
Taxa named by Arthur William Baden Powell